Kalush may refer to:

 Kalush, Afghanistan
 Kalush, Albania
 Kalush, Ukraine, seat of Kalush Raion
 WFC Naftokhimik Kalush, a women's professional football club based in Kalush, Ukraine
 Kalush (rap group), a musical group from Kalush, Ukraine
 Kalush Raion, Ukraine